Spastic paraplegia 23 (SPG autosomal recessive) is a 25cM gene locus at 1q24-q32. A genome-wide linkage screen has associated this locus with a type of hereditary spastic paraplegia (HSP).

References

Further reading 

 

Proteins